Jill Dunlop is a Canadian politician who is the Ontario Minister of Colleges and Universities since June 18, 2021. She represents the riding of Simcoe North in the Legislative Assembly of Ontario as a member of the Progressive Conservative Party since 2018  and was also the Associate Minister of Children and Women's Issues.

She was born and raised in the rural town of Coldwater Ontario, and is the daughter of Jane Dunlop - former Deputy Mayor of Township of Severn, ON and Garfield Dunlop, who represented the same electoral district from 1999 to 2015.

Electoral record

Notes

References

Progressive Conservative Party of Ontario MPPs
Members of the Executive Council of Ontario
Women government ministers of Canada
21st-century Canadian politicians
21st-century Canadian women politicians
Women MPPs in Ontario
Living people
1975 births